Marion Evan Castillo Magat (born October 22, 1989) is a Filipino professional basketball player for the NLEX Road Warriors of the Philippine Basketball Association (PBA). He played college basketball for the NU Bulldogs of the University Athletic Association of the Philippines (UAAP).

Professional career
Magat was drafted 16th overall by the Alaska Aces during the 2015 PBA draft.

During the 2019 offseason, he signed with the NLEX Road Warriors.

On June 10, 2019, he was traded to the TNT KaTropa in a three-team trade involving TNT, NLEX, and NorthPort Batang Pier.

On February 28, 2020, he was traded to the Blackwater Elite in a three-team trade involving TNT, NLEX, and Blackwater. On May 14, 2021, he signed a one-year extension with the Blackwater Bossing (formerly Elite).

On November 16, he was traded back to NLEX for Mike Ayonayon and Will McAloney.

On January 18, 2023, Magat was assigned to the Cavitex Braves, NLEX's affiliate 3x3 team.

PBA career statistics

As of the end of 2022–23 season

Season-by-season averages

|-
| align=left | 
| align=left | Alaska
| 13 || 4.4 || .190 || .333 || .286 || .9 || – || .1 || .4 || .8
|-
| align=left | 
| align=left | Alaska
| 18 || 7.7 || .275 || .000 || .643 || 1.8 || .1 || .1 || .2 || 1.7
|-
| align=left | 
| align=left | Alaska
| 19 || 10.1 || .444 || .208 || .444 || 2.5 || .3 || .2 || .3 || 3.6
|-
| align=left rowspan=2| 
| align=left | NLEX
| rowspan=2|32 || rowspan=2|9.7 || rowspan=2|.460 || rowspan=2|.241 || rowspan=2|.529 || rowspan=2|3.0 || rowspan=2|.3 || rowspan=2|.1 || rowspan=2|.5 || rowspan=2|3.3
|-
| align=left | TNT
|-
| align=left | 
| align=left | Blackwater
| 10 || 18.3 || .447 || .000 || .412 || 4.0 || .2 || .4 || .7 || 4.1
|-
| align=left rowspan=2| 
| align=left | Blackwater
| rowspan=2|17 || rowspan=2|14.1 || rowspan=2|.582 || rowspan=2|.143 || rowspan=2|.462 || rowspan=2|4.2 || rowspan=2|.5 || rowspan=2|.2 || rowspan=2|.6 || rowspan=2|4.5
|-
| align=left | NLEX
|-
| align=left | 
| align=left | NLEX
| 9 || 9.4 || .316 || .000 || .500 || 1.6 || .8 || .0 || .1 || 1.6
|-class=sortbottom
| align=center colspan=2 | Career
| 118 || 10.2 || .437 || .192 || .483 || 2.7 || .3 || .1 || .4 || 2.9

References

External links
PBA.ph profile
Inquirer.net profile

1989 births
Living people
Alaska Aces (PBA) draft picks
Alaska Aces (PBA) players
Basketball players from Pangasinan
Blackwater Bossing players
Centers (basketball)
Filipino men's 3x3 basketball players
Filipino men's basketball players
NLEX Road Warriors players
NU Bulldogs basketball players
PBA 3x3 players
People from Dagupan
Power forwards (basketball)
TNT Tropang Giga players